Żochy may refer to the following places:
Żochy, Ciechanów County in Masovian Voivodeship (east-central Poland)
Żochy, Ostrołęka County in Masovian Voivodeship (east-central Poland)
Żochy, Sokołów County in Masovian Voivodeship (east-central Poland)